The 1965 NCAA University Division basketball tournament involved 23 schools playing in single-elimination play to determine the national champion of men's NCAA Division I college basketball. It began on March 8, 1965, and ended with the championship game on March 20 in Portland, Oregon. A total of 27 games were played, including a third-place game in each region and a national third-place game.

Second-ranked UCLA, coached by John Wooden, won the national title with a 91–80 victory in the final game over #1 Michigan, coached by Dave Strack. Bill Bradley of Princeton was named the tournament's Most Outstanding Player.

UCLA finished the season with 28 wins and two defeats. In the championship game, the Bruins shot 56.9% with Gail Goodrich's 42 points and Kenny Washington's 17 points to become the fifth team to win consecutive championships.

Of note, this was the last NCAA Tournament for Henry Iba of Oklahoma State.

Locations

Portland, Oregon became the eighth host city, and the Memorial Coliseum the ninth host venue, of the Final Four. At the time the five-year-old arena was the third-youngest arena to host a Final Four, after Freedom Hall (2 years old at the time of its first Final Four) and McGaw Memorial Hall (4 years old), and the first opened in the 1960s. The tournament featured one new venue and host site, as the tournament came to Western Kentucky State College and E.A. Diddle Arena, the home of the Hilltoppers. Meanwhile, the midwest and west regional first rounds were played in one arena, the Lubbock Municipal Coliseum. All eight venues used in the tournament in 1965 would host games again afterwards.

Teams

Bracket
* – Denotes overtime period

East region

Mideast region

Midwest region

West region

Final Four

National Third Place Game

Regional third place games

See also
 1965 NCAA College Division basketball tournament
 1965 National Invitation Tournament
 1965 NAIA Division I men's basketball tournament
 1964–65 UCLA Bruins men's basketball team

References

NCAA Division I men's basketball tournament
Ncaa
Basketball competitions in Portland, Oregon
NCAA University Division basketball tournament
NCAA University Division basketball tournament
NCAA University Division basketball tournament
Basketball competitions in Lubbock, Texas